Styrax hemsleyanus (老鸹铃), the Hemsley snowball, is a species of flowering plant in the family Styracaceae, native to central China.

The plant has gained the Royal Horticultural Society's Award of Garden Merit.

References

Flora of China
hemsleyanus